Rumia railway station is the main railway station serving the town of Rumia, in the Pomeranian Voivodeship, Poland. The station opened in 1880 and is located on the Gdańsk–Stargard railway and the parallel Gdańsk Śródmieście–Rumia railway. The train services are operated by PKP, Przewozy Regionalne and SKM Tricity.

Train services
The station is served by the following services:

 Intercity services (IC) Łódź Fabryczna — Warszawa — Gdańsk Glowny — Kołobrzeg
Intercity services (IC) Szczecin - Koszalin - Słupsk - Gdynia - Gdańsk
Intercity services (IC) Szczecin - Koszalin - Słupsk - Gdynia - Gdańsk - Elbląg/Iława - Olsztyn
Intercity services (IC) Szczecin - Koszalin - Słupsk - Gdynia - Gdańsk - Elbląg - Olsztyn - Białystok
Intercity services (TLK) Kołobrzeg — Gdynia Główna — Warszawa Wschodnia — Kraków Główny
Regional services (R) Tczew — Słupsk  
Regional services (R) Malbork — Słupsk  
Regional services (R) Elbląg — Słupsk  
Regional services (R) Słupsk — Bydgoszcz Główna 
Regional services (R) Władysławowo - Reda - Gdynia Główna
Regional services (R) Hel - Władysławowo - Reda - Gdynia Główna
Regional services (R) Luzino — Gdynia Główna
Regional services (R) Słupsk — Gdynia Główna
Szybka Kolej Miejska services (SKM) (Lębork -) Wejherowo - Reda - Rumia - Gdynia - Sopot - Gdansk

References

External links

 This article is based upon a translation of the Polish language version as of August 2016.

Railway stations served by Szybka Kolej Miejska (Tricity)
Railway stations served by Przewozy Regionalne InterRegio
Railway stations in Pomeranian Voivodeship
Wejherowo County
Railway stations in Poland opened in 1880